God's Children may refer to:

 "God's Children" (The Kinks song), 1971
 "God's Children" (The Gutter Twins song), 2008

See also
 Children of God (disambiguation)
 All God's Children (disambiguation)
 God's Child (disambiguation)